Morven is a town in Anson County, North Carolina, United States. The population was 335 at the 2020 census. The town was named after a town in Argyllshire, Scotland.

Geography
Morven is located at  (34.863351, -79.999959).

Morven is located on US Highway 52.

Demographics

As of the census of 2000, there were 579 people, 207 households, and 148 families residing in the town.  The population density was 534.1 people per square mile (207.0/km2).  There were 249 housing units at an average density of 229.7 per square mile (89.0/km2).  The racial makeup of the town was 22.45% White, 76.86% African American, 0.35% Native American, 0.35% from other races. Hispanic or Latino of any race were 0.35% of the population.

There were 207 households, out of which 37.7% had children under the age of 18 living with them, 35.7% were married couples living together, 30.4% had a female householder with no husband present, and 28.5% were non-families. 25.1% of all households were made up of individuals, and 13.0% had someone living alone who was 65 years of age or older.  The average household size was 2.80 and the average family size was 3.37.

In the town, the population was spread out, with 34.0% under the age of 18, 9.2% from 18 to 24, 26.1% from 25 to 44, 18.0% from 45 to 64, and 12.8% who were 65 years of age or older.  The median age was 30 years. For every 100 females, there were 72.8 males.  For every 100 females age 18 and over, there were 69.0 males.

The median income for a household in the town was $23,333, and the median income for a family was $30,000. Males had a median income of $27,000 versus $17,344 for females. The per capita income for the town was $9,923.  About 24.2% of families and 24.9% of the population were below the poverty line, including 33.3% of those under age 18 and 17.1% of those age 65 or over.

Notable Residents
 Juanita Moody (1924-2015) - American cryptographer and intelligence analyst
 Haywood Rivers (1922-2001) - African-American artist and gallery owner

References

Towns in Anson County, North Carolina
Towns in North Carolina
Populated places established in 1823